Jelidan (also Romanized as Jelīdān; also known as Jīldān and Dzhelidan) is a village in Aliabad-e Ziba Kenar Rural District, Lasht-e Nesha District, Rasht County, Gilan Province, Iran. At the 2006 census, its population was 1,181, in 345 families.

References 

Populated places in Rasht County